Jennifer Patricia Beattie  (born 13 May 1991) is a Scottish professional footballer who plays for Arsenal of the FA WSL and the Scotland national team. Beattie is a tall, strong, right-footed player. Although typically a defender or midfielder, she is also an accomplished goalscorer. She is the daughter of former Scotland and British Lions rugby union player, John Beattie.

Early life
Beattie began playing football with her brother Johnnie and his friends, while at primary school. She was eventually selected to the Glasgow Primary School select team, as the only girl, and was named captain. Beattie then played with Hamilton Academical's boys' teams.

Club career

Queen's Park
Beattie began her senior career in the Scottish Women's Premier League with Queen's Park FC Ladies as a 15-year-old. She helped the club reach the final of the Scottish Women's Premier League Cup in November 2007; Queen's Park lost 4–0 to a Hibernian Ladies team containing Beattie's future Arsenal teammate Kim Little.

Celtic
In January 2008 Beattie moved to Celtic Ladies. She spent a year and a half with the club before leaving to join Arsenal Ladies.

Arsenal
Beattie joined Arsenal in July 2009; her first goals for Arsenal came on 8 November 2009 where she scored a stunning treble to seal a comeback against Chelsea after being 2–0 down at half-time. In March 2010, Beattie played in attack during Arsenal's 2–0 defeat by FCR 2001 Duisburg in the quarter-final of the UEFA Women's Champions League. While at Arsenal, she won the 2009 Women's Premier League, the 2011 and 2012 FA Women's League Cup, now called the Continental Cup, and the 2011 and 2013 FA Cups.

Montpellier
Beattie left Arsenal in July 2013 to join French Division 1 Féminine side Montpellier HSC on a two-year contract. While at Montpellier, she made 25 regular season appearances with the side, scoring 5 goals in the process.

Manchester City
Beattie returned to England with Manchester City Women for the 2015 season. In November 2018, she became the fifth player to reach 100 appearances for the club. She played a role in City's victories in the 2016 FA WSL, the 2016–17 and 2018–19 editions of the Women's FA Cup, and the 2018–19 FA Women's League Cup.

Melbourne City (loan)

Beattie joined Manchester City's sister club Melbourne City during Manchester City's offseason, before the third round of the 2015–16 W-League season. While at Melbourne City, she helped the club during its double W-League and Grand Final wins, as well as their 100% record season.

Return to Arsenal
Beattie rejoined Arsenal in June 2019.

International career

Beattie represented Scotland at under-17 level, and made her debut for the under-19s at the age of 14.

Beattie made her debut for the senior Scotland side in March 2008, against the United States in Cyprus, as second-half substitute for Leanne Ross. She went on to establish herself in the national side during the 2009 European Championships qualifying campaign. She scored her first international goal as Scotland beat Portugal 4–1 in a European Championship qualifying game in May 2008. Beattie played in both legs of the qualifying play-off defeat to Russia in October and November 2008. After the first leg, Beattie and Kim Little were identified by football writer Graham Spiers as talented youngsters.

In March 2011, Beattie played as a striker and scored in Scotland's 2–0 win over England, the first time Scotland had beaten England since 1977. Beattie became a regular with the Scotland national team. While she was instrumental in helping Scotland reach its first major tournament, the 2017 UEFA Women's Euro Championship, she missed out on the tournament due to injury. She continued her contribution helping Scotland qualify for its first FIFA Women's World Cup, the 2019 tournament in France. On 15 May 2019 Beattie was named to the Scotland's 2019 Women's World Cup squad. At the finals, she scored in the 3–3 tie with Argentina.

On 27 January 2023, Beattie announced her retirement from international football, having made 143 appearances and scoring 24 goals.

Personal life
Beattie is the daughter of former Scotland and British Lions rugby union player, John Beattie and the sister of former Scottish rugby union international Johnnie Beattie. She attended Jordanhill School in Glasgow and on signing for Arsenal enrolled at Hertfordshire University.

In October 2020, Beattie was diagnosed with breast cancer. She had surgery to remove the lump and, as the cancer had not spread, began radiotherapy instead of chemotherapy. Despite treatment Beattie continued to appear for both Arsenal and Scotland. Beattie won the Helen Rollason Award for 2021, in recognition of her work since the cancer diagnosis.

Beattie was appointed Member of the Order of the British Empire (MBE) in the 2023 New Year Honours for services to association football and charity.

Career statistics
Scores and results list Scotland's goal tally first, score column indicates score after each Beattie goal.

Honours 
Melbourne City

 A-League Women: 2015–16

Arsenal

 FA Women's Super League: 2008–09, 2009–10, 2011, 2012, 2018–19

 FA Women's Cup: 2010–11, 2012–13
 FA WSL Cup / FA Women's League Cup: 2012, 2022–23

Manchester City

 FA Women's Super League: 2016

 Women's FA Cup: 2016–17, 2018–19

 FA Women's League Cup: 2016, 2018–19

See also
 List of women's footballers with 100 or more caps
 Scottish FA Women's International Roll of Honour

References

External links

Profile at the SFA

Profile at Mancity.com
Profile at UEFA
Instagram
Twitter

1991 births
Living people
Scottish women's footballers
Scotland women's international footballers
Women's association football defenders
Celtic F.C. Women players
Arsenal W.F.C. players
Montpellier HSC (women) players
Manchester City W.F.C. players
Melbourne City FC (A-League Women) players
Footballers from Glasgow
Scottish expatriate women's footballers
Expatriate women's footballers in France
Women's Super League players
A-League Women players
FIFA Century Club
Scottish expatriate sportspeople in Australia
Expatriate women's soccer players in Australia
Division 1 Féminine players
2019 FIFA Women's World Cup players
Queen's Park F.C. (women) players
Members of the Order of the British Empire
Scottish expatriate sportspeople in France